Steven So'oialo (born 11 May 1977 in Apia, Samoa) is a Samoan rugby union footballer. He played scrum-half for English club Harlequins and formerly Orrell. He played for Manu Samoa in the 1999 and 2003 Rugby World Cup. He also played for the Pacific Islanders team in 2004. He is the older brother of New Zealand All Blacks rugby union international and Wellington Hurricanes Super Rugby player, Rodney So'oialo, and of James So'oialo, who has also represented Samoa internationally.

External links
RWC 2007 profile
 Manu Samoa supporters website
 Pacific Islanders Rugby Teams supporters website

1977 births
Harlequin F.C. players
Living people
Orrell R.U.F.C. players
Pacific Islanders rugby union players
Rugby union scrum-halves
Samoa international rugby union players
Samoan rugby union players
Samoan expatriate rugby union players
Expatriate rugby union players in England
Samoan expatriate sportspeople in England
People educated at Mana College
Samoa international rugby sevens players
Male rugby sevens players
Sportspeople from Apia